Charles Blewitt may refer to:

 Charles Blewitt (cricketer) (1877–1937), English cricketer
 Joe Blewitt (Charles Edward Blewitt, 1895–1954), British long-distance runner